Pekka Olavi Halme (5 March 1927 – 10 January 2018) was a Finnish athlete. He competed in the men's high jump at the 1952 Summer Olympics.

References

1927 births
2018 deaths
Athletes (track and field) at the 1952 Summer Olympics
Finnish male high jumpers
Olympic athletes of Finland